Brigadier John Percival Whiteley OBE (7 January 1898 – 4 July 1943) was a British Army officer and a Conservative Party politician.

Whiteley was commissioned into the Royal Artillery during the First World War, ending the war as a lieutenant. In 1926 he transferred to the Life Guards, retiring in 1928 and joining the 99th (Buckinghamshire and Berkshire Yeomanry) Field Brigade, Royal Artillery (Territorial Army) as a captain. He was promoted major in 1932.

He stood unsuccessfully at the 1929 general election in Birmingham Aston, and entered the House of Commons 8 years later when he was elected as Member of Parliament (MP) for Buckingham at a by-election in 1937, after the sitting MP George Bowyer was elevated to the peerage as Baron Denham.

When World War II broke out, Whiteley resumed military service. He was active at Dunkirk, and died in 1943, aged 45, when he was killed in a plane crash in Gibraltar, along with the Conservative MP Victor Cazalet and General Władysław Sikorski, the leader of the Polish government-in-exile.

References

External links

British Army Officers 1939−1945
Generals of World War II

1898 births
1943 deaths
People educated at Shrewsbury School
Graduates of the Royal Military Academy, Woolwich
Conservative Party (UK) MPs for English constituencies
UK MPs 1935–1945
British Army personnel of World War I
British Army brigadiers of World War II
British Army personnel killed in World War II
Royal Artillery officers
British Life Guards officers
Officers of the Order of the British Empire
Victims of aviation accidents or incidents in Gibraltar
Victims of aviation accidents or incidents in 1943